King's County was a constituency represented in the Irish House of Commons until 1800. The county was renamed as County Offaly after Irish independence.

Members of Parliament
1585: Sir George Bouchier and Henry Waring
1613–1615: Adam Loftus and Sir Francis Rushe 
1634–1635: Sir William Colley and Terence Coghlan
1639–1649: John Coughlan and Sir William Parsons of Birr
1661–1666: John Weaver and Henry Lestrange

1689–1801

Notes

References

Historic constituencies in County Offaly
Constituencies of the Parliament of Ireland (pre-1801)
1800 disestablishments in Ireland
Constituencies disestablished in 1800